Paul L. Weston (born 9 April 1957) is a former Australian rules footballer who played with  in the Victorian Football League (VFL) as well as ,  and  in the South Australian National Football League (SANFL) during the 1970s and 1980s.

Early career
Weston started his career at  whilst still studying at Glengowrie High School. He quickly established himself as a key player, winning the club best and fairest in 1976 and taking the captaincy in 1979 at only 21 years of age. However, premiership success was elusive; during his time with the Tigers, Weston was a member of five losing grand finals – in 1974, 1975, 1977, 1981 and 1982. Frustrated by the lack of premiership success in his home state, Weston decided to try his luck in Victoria.  won the race to recruit Weston and he relocated to Melbourne in January 1983 to begin training with the club. However, there was a disagreement with the transfer fee; Glenelg had asked for AUD 175,000, but Essendon's offer was around AUD 90,000. The case was taken to the National Football League Appeals Board, which in March 1983 set an undisclosed compromise fee that both Essendon and Glenelg were expected to agree on. Weston said afterward: "I am very relieved and happy ... I can now get on with the business of playing football instead of worrying about court cases."

Success
Weston had played mostly as a centreman at Glenelg, but became a key defender while at Essendon. Weston made an immediate impression at his new club, winning the most consistent player award in his first season. Weston, and Essendon, had their revenge when they won back-to-back premierships against Hawthorn in 1984 and 1985. He was a South Australian State of Origin representative and won a Fos Williams Medal in 1982 for his performance against Western Australia at Football Park.

References

External links

Essendon Football Club profile
Profile at Australian Football

1957 births
Living people
Australian rules footballers from South Australia
Essendon Football Club players
Essendon Football Club Premiership players
Glenelg Football Club players
West Torrens Football Club coaches
South Australian State of Origin players
South Australian Football Hall of Fame inductees
Two-time VFL/AFL Premiership players